The Pontifical is a liturgical book used by a bishop. It may also refer specifically to the Roman Rite Roman Pontifical.

When used as an adjective, Pontifical may be used to describe things related to the office of a Bishop (see also Pontiff#Christianity), such as the following:
Pontifical High Mass
Pontifical vestments
Pontifical gloves
Pontifical sandals